Gheorghe Enache (22 September 1934 – 1971) was a Romanian sports shooter. He competed at the 1960 Summer Olympics and the 1964 Summer Olympics.

References

1934 births
1971 deaths
Romanian male sport shooters
Olympic shooters of Romania
Shooters at the 1960 Summer Olympics
Shooters at the 1964 Summer Olympics
Sportspeople from Bucharest
20th-century Romanian people